Butter daisy is a common name for several plants and may refer to:

 Coreopsis grandiflora
 Leucanthemum vulgare
 
 Ranunculus acris
 Verbesina encelioides syn. Ximenesia encelioides